Marta Xargay Casademont (born 20 December 1990) is a retired Spanish professional basketball player. She played for Phoenix Mercury of the WNBA, and for several European teams in Czech Republic, Russia and Spain. She played for the Spain women's national basketball team from 2011 to 2020. She won EuroLeague Women 2010–11 with Perfumerías Avenida Baloncesto. She left Spain in 2015, joining both USK Praha of the Czech League in 2015 and the Phoenix Mercury of the WNBA on 11 February 2015. In September 2018 she signed for Dynamo Kursk of the Russian Premier League., and in January 2020 she returned to her youth club Uni Girona CB. After not playing in the 2020-21 season, she announced her retirement in July 2021.

Club career
Xargay started playing basketball from a young age in clubs in her hometown Girona, entering the youth levels of Uni Girona CB at 14 and making it to the senior team and the Spanish second tier. In 2009 she signed for CB Avenida from Salamanca, where in the following six seasons she won two leagues, three cups and one EuroLeague.

During 2015 and 2016 she played both in the WNBA with Phoenix Mercury and the European season with USK Praha, where she won the 2016, 2017 and 2018 Czech League. Due to her commitment to the Spain national team, she opted not to play in the WNBA in 2017 or 2018. She played for one and a half seasons in Russian team Dynamo Kursk, before returning to Uni Girona CB in January 2020.

Career statistics

WNBA

EuroLeague and EuroCup statistics

National team
Xargay started playing with Spain's youth teams at 16, winning a total of five medals from 2006 to 2010. She made her debut with the senior team in 2011 and up to her last game in 2020, she had 147 caps and 9,2 PPG, participating in the Rio 2016 Olympics, two World Championships and five European Championships:

  2006 FIBA Europe Under-16 Championship (youth)
  2007 FIBA Europe Under-18 Championship (youth)
 5th 2008 FIBA Europe Under-18 Championship (youth)
  2009 FIBA Europe Under-20 Championship (youth)
  2009 FIBA Under-19 World Championship (youth) (MVP)
  2010 FIBA Europe Under-20 Championship (youth)
 9th 2011 Eurobasket
  2013 Eurobasket
  2014 World Championship
  2015 Eurobasket
  2016 Summer Olympics
  2017 Eurobasket
  2018 World Championship
  2019 Eurobasket

Personal life
Xargay is married to WNBA star Breanna Stewart. The couple got engaged in May 2020 in Papago Park, Phoenix, AZ. On July 6, 2021 the couple married on the rooftop of Stewart’s apartment building. On August 9, 2021, the couple’s daughter Ruby Mae Stewart Xargay was born in Idaho via gestational carrier.

References

External links
 
 
 Marta Xargay at FIBA Europe
 
 
 
 
 

1990 births
Living people
Basketball players at the 2016 Summer Olympics
Basketball players from Catalonia
LGBT basketball players
Spanish lesbians
Spanish LGBT sportspeople
Lesbian sportswomen
Medalists at the 2016 Summer Olympics
Olympic basketball players of Spain
Olympic medalists in basketball
Olympic silver medalists for Spain
Phoenix Mercury players
Shooting guards
Spanish expatriate sportspeople in the Czech Republic
Spanish expatriate basketball people in Russia
Spanish expatriate basketball people in the United States
Spanish women's basketball players
Sportspeople from Girona
21st-century Spanish LGBT people